Karen Philipp (born September 7, 1945) is an American singer and actress.

Career
Philipp came to national prominence in 1968 when she was hired as one of the two female vocalists in the second iteration of Sérgio Mendes and Brasil '66, debuting on their Top Ten best-selling album, Fool on the Hill. She remained with Brasil '66 (and its successor group, Brasil '77) until she left in 1972 to pursue an acting career.

She portrayed Lt. Dish in the first season of M*A*S*H. Though her role was written out of the series after two episodes, a shot including her was used in the opening credits for the remainder of the series. She later had a recurring role on Quincy, M.E. as Robin Rollin (seasons 3 to 6).

Philipp also posed nude in a pictorial in the September 1972 issue of Playboy promoting her role in M*A*S*H.

Personal life
Philipp married movie producer Pat Proft and they have a son. They reside in Medina, Minnesota.

Filmography

Film

Television

References

External links 

1945 births
Living people
American television actresses
20th-century American actresses
20th-century American singers
20th-century American women singers
People from Salina, Kansas
Actresses from Kansas
Singers from Kansas
Sergio Mendes and Brasil '66 members
21st-century American women